The Widow in the Window is a studio album by trumpeter Kenny Wheeler recorded in 1990 and released on the ECM label. "Ana", the longest piece on the album, was originally written for Alexander von Schlippenbach's Berlin Contemporary Jazz Orchestra, which would eventually be recorded in 1989. "Ma Belle Hélène" is a calembour which refers to Wheeler's two sisters, Mabel and Helen.

Reception
The Allmusic review by Scott Yanow awarded the album 4 stars stating " Kenny Wheeler's music occupies its own unique area between post bop and free jazz and virtually all of his recordings are recommended to adventurous listeners, including this one".

Track listing
All compositions by Kenny Wheeler

 "Aspire" - 12:28
 "Ma Belle Hélène" - 8:45
 "The Widow in the Window" - 10:27
 "Ana" - 14:52
 "Hotel Le Hot" - 8:31
 "Now, and Now Again" - 6:11

Personnel
Kenny Wheeler — trumpet, flugelhorn
John Abercrombie — guitar
John Taylor — piano
Dave Holland — bass
Peter Erskine — drums

References

ECM Records albums
Kenny Wheeler albums
1990 albums
Albums produced by Manfred Eicher